Joffre T. Whisenton is an American academic administrator. He was the first African-American student to earn a PhD from the University of Alabama. He served as the president of Southern University from 1985 to 1989.

References

Living people
University of Alabama alumni
Southern University presidents
Year of birth missing (living people)